Dhirendra Agarwal (born 2 August 1955) is a member of the 11th, 12th and  14th Lok Sabha of India . He represents the Chatra constituency of Jharkhand and currently is a member of the Rashtriya Janata Dal (RJD) political party. He had won Lok Sabha election in 11th Lok Sabha  & 12th Lok Sabha as a member of Bhartiya Janta Party (BJP).

References 

1955 births
Living people
India MPs 2004–2009
Rashtriya Janata Dal politicians
India MPs 1996–1997
India MPs 1998–1999
Lok Sabha members from Jharkhand
People from Chatra district
Bharatiya Janata Party politicians from Jharkhand
Jharkhand politicians by Rashtriya Janata Dal